Punishment to the Traitor (Spanish:Castigo al traidor) is a 1966 Argentine drama film directed by Manuel Antín and starring Sergio Renán, Marcela López Rey and Jorge Barreiro.

Cast
 Sergio Renán 
 Marcela López Rey 
 Jorge Barreiro 
 Eva Donge 
 Miguel Ligero 
 Aldo Mayo 
 Enrique Thibaut

References

Bibliography 
 Helene C. Weldt-Basson. Postmodernism's Role in Latin American Literature: The Life and Work of Augusto Roa Bastos. Springer, 2010.

External links 
 

1966 films
1966 drama films
Argentine drama films
1960s Spanish-language films
Films directed by Manuel Antín
1960s Argentine films